The intermaxillary segment in an embryo is a mass of tissue formed by the merging of tissues in the vicinity of the nose. It is essential for human survival. It is primordial, since in the further development of the embryo this particular mass no longer appears, but parts of it remain in "the intermaxillary portion of the upper jaw, the portion of the upper lip, and the primary palate".

More precisely, the rounded lateral angles of the medial process constitute the globular processes. It is also known as the "Intermaxillary segment". It gives rise to the premaxilla.

See also
Philtrum

References

External links
 https://web.archive.org/web/20060925073054/http://www.ana.ed.ac.uk/anatomy/database/humat/notes/embryo/branchi.htm
 https://web.archive.org/web/20080219072510/http://isc.temple.edu/marino/embryology/Face98/face_text.htm

Embryology